Matthew Sewell is a Canadian football offensive lineman who played in the Canadian Football League. After the 2012 CIS season, he was ranked as the fourth best player in the Canadian Football League’s Amateur Scouting Bureau final rankings for players eligible in the 2013 CFL Draft and third by players in Canadian Interuniversity Sport. Sewell was drafted in the first round, eighth overall by the Toronto Argonauts, despite having signed with the Tennessee Titans of National Football League. He played college football for the McMaster Marauders and helped them to win the 47th Vanier Cup After being released by the Titans near the end of May 2013, Sewell decided to return play one more year of CIS football with the McMaster Marauders while completing his Masters of Business Administration.

On February 12, 2014, Sewell signed with the Toronto Argonauts of the Canadian Football League.

On July 2, 2016, Sewell and Mitchell Gale were traded to the Saskatchewan Roughriders for Shawn Lemon and a conditional 2018 CFL Draft pick.

References

External links
Toronto Argonauts bio

Living people
Players of Canadian football from Ontario
Canadian football offensive linemen
McMaster Marauders football players
Toronto Argonauts players
Tennessee Titans players
Saskatchewan Roughriders players
People from Milton, Ontario
1990 births